Sylvia Lenore Massy is an American record producer, mixer, engineer, instructor and author. Massy is renowned for her multifaceted production/mixing and engineering skills, with her first major breakthrough occurring with 1993's Undertow, the full-length triple platinum-selling debut for Los Angeles alternative metal band Tool as well as her work with System of a Down, Johnny Cash, Red Hot Chili Peppers, and Brazilian band South Cry.

History
Massy's first project was in the mid-1980s as producer, engineer, and mixer for a compilation album titled Rat Music for Rat People, Vol. 3 on the CD Presents label. Acts featured included Adolescents, Raw Power, Doggy Style and Mojo Nixon. She followed this with producing the punk band Verbal Abuse for Boner Records, engineering two projects for metal band Exodus and co-producing the Sea Hags independent album with a young guitarist Kirk Hammett, who had just finished the Master of Puppets album with thrash metal group Metallica. She also produced "Television, Drug of a Nation" by the Beatnigs, the former band of the Disposable Heroes of Hiphoprisy's Michael Franti.

From Green Jellö to Tool
Towards the end of the 1980s, Massy moved from San Francisco to Los Angeles and worked at Tower Records on Sunset Blvd. At Tower she met the members of a Buffalo, New York, band named Green Jellö (later known as Green Jellÿ) and recorded their debut album. After becoming a staff engineer at Larrabee Sound in West Hollywood, she was hired by Zoo Records/BMG to produce Green Jellö's major label debut album, which featured members of a new Los Angeles group called Tool. On Green Jellö's Cereal Killer album, Tool's Maynard James Keenan sings on "Three Little Pigs", and Tool's drummer Danny Carey plays on the album. This began a relationship Massy would have with the band Tool that would span two records: Opiate and Undertow.

Los Angeles and Larrabee Sound
In Los Angeles, Massy was an engineer, producer or mixer on recordings from artists including Aerosmith, Babyface, Big Daddy Kane, Bobby Brown, Prince, Julio Iglesias, Seal, Skunk Anansie, Paula Abdul, Ryuichi Sakamoto and many more. She worked with manager Gary Kurfirst on Irish rock band Cyclefly for Kurfirst's Radioactive Records. At Larrabee Sound, Sylvia connected with producer Rick Rubin and would work with him on several projects spanning seven years.

Sound City
From 1994 until 2001, Massy's vintage Neve 8038 console and other specialized recording equipment occupied Studio B at Sound City Studios in Van Nuys, California. Besides Massy's own work at Sound City, several other successful projects were recorded on Massy's equipment during these years, including albums by Sheryl Crow, Queens of the Stone Age, Black Rebel Motorcycle Club, Smashing Pumpkins, the Black Crowes and Lenny Kravitz. Massy's equipment is visible in many scenes of Dave Grohl's film  
Sound City.

Rubin and beyond
Massy engineered and mixed several projects for producer Rick Rubin on his label American Recordings, including Johnny Cash's album Unchained, which won a Grammy award for Best Country Album in 1997. With Rubin, she also recorded Tom Petty and the Heartbreakers, Slayer, Donovan, Geto Boys, the Black Crowes, Danzig, and System of a Down's debut album. In the '90s, Massy produced material for Red Hot Chili Peppers, Sevendust, and Powerman 5000, which featured guest appearances from Rob Zombie and actor Malachi Throne; and for newcomer Pauley Perrette.
In 1997 Massy mixed the Beastie Boys' "Tibetan Freedom Concert" in New York with Adam Yauch and producer Pat McCarthy.

RadioStar Studios and international acclaim
Starting in 2001, Massy owned and operated RadioStar Studios out of the Weed Palace Theater until its closing in 2012.   She acquired the theater property in 2001 in Weed, California, and operated it as a recording studio for 11 years, with notable clients having been Sublime, Dishwalla, Swirl 360, Econoline Crush, Cog, Spiderbait, Norma Jean, Built To Spill and From First To Last (featuring Sonny Moore of Skrillex.) Several international hits came out of RadioStar Studios with Massy, including Spiderbait's "Black Betty" which reached No. 1 on Australia's ARIA chart in 2004; Cog's The New Normal album received the Australian Triple J "J Award" in 2005; Seigmen's "Metropolis" which reached No. 4 on Norway's sales charts; Klepht was named "Best Portuguese Act" by MTV Europe; Econoline Crush received a Canadian Juno nomination and Platinum sales status for their The Devil You Know album; and Animal Alpha's EP reached Gold sales status in Norway in 2005.

Artwork, writing and music festivals
In the 2000s, she wrote a regular column in Mix Magazine called "Gear Stories" which discussed vintage recording equipment versus modern equivalents. She wrote an essay about Thomas Edison's contribution to the recording industry which was included in the official Grammy Awards Program. In 2011, Massy co-founded the 4&20 Blackbird Music Festival which operated for two years in downtown Weed, California. The festival drew approximately 7000 people and featured 250 musical acts during its run.

In January 2015, Massy began to write a book called Recording Unhinged for Hal Leonard Publishing. The book was released in March 2016. Interviews and contributors for the book include Hans Zimmer, Geoff Emerick, Bob Ezrin, Bruce Swedien, Michael Franti, Bob Clearmountain, Al Schmitt, Elliot Scheiner, Linda Perry, Ross Robinson, Matt Wallace, Ross Hogarth, Shelly Yakus, Paul Wolff. Massy also illustrated the book.

The cover of the March 2016 issue of Electronic Musician Magazine features Massy's illustration of a dinosaur and a robot in a battle.

As an educator

In 2015 and 2018, Massy was a visiting professor at Berklee College of Music in Boston. In 2018 Massy taught a workshop at the Abbey Road Institute in London, UK. In 2016 she lectured at SAE Institute's audio engineering schools in London and Munich. She has presented periodic recording workshops in Dresden at Castle Rohrsdorf and at Mix with the Masters in Les Studios de la Fabrique in Saint-Remy-de-Provence in the south of France. In 2017 Massy conducted a workshop and lecture at the Conservatory of Recording Arts and Sciences in Gilbert, Arizona, and a workshop at Tecnólogico de Monterrey in Mexico City for several hundred students. She has also conducted workshops in Sardinia, Oslo and Gdansk and Rome.

In 2017, Massy and co-author Chris Johnson began a collaboration for a professional recording course at Berklee based on their book, Recording Unhinged.

In 2019, Massy toured and conducted workshops for Abbey Road Institute locations in Amsterdam, Berlin, Paris and London.

Current status

Massy lives in Ashland, Oregon and works out of her private studio. She continues to work as an independent producer, educator and music promoter. She has appeared on an episode of Pensado's Place, an industry video program with producer/mixer Dave Pensado and was nominated for "The Big Award" at the Pensado Awards in 2014 . Massy is a member of NARAS and served on the P&E Wing Steering Committee and Advisory Boards. In 2009, she traveled to Washington D.C. to lobby for musician's Performance Rights and continues to be involved with musician, producer and educational advocacy work on behalf of NARAS. In February 2016 Massy won the Music Producers Guild's "MPG Inspiration Award" at the MPG Awards in London. The award was presented by John Leckie.

In 2015 Massy mixed for Cage the Elephant and Soilwork. The latter part of 2015 and early 2016 saw her overseeing production of Avatar's album Feathers and Flesh. In 2016 Massy recorded Seattle all-woman noise band Thunderpussy in an abandoned nuclear power plant's cooling tower for the song "Torpedo Love". She recorded singer-songwriter Sarah Brendel in the underground venue at the Merkers Show Mine, a retired salt mine in Merkers, Germany.

In early 2017 she produced and engineered the Melvins at the Village Studios in Santa Monica while being filmed by Mix with the Masters. She also produced albums by Econoline Crush, Far From Alaska and Dishwalla, and was hired to re-work the recordings of Grey Daze, a side project by Linkin Park's frontman Chester Bennington. In early 2018, Massy traveled to Mexico City to produce the MTV Unplugged television broadcast (and subsequent album release) of the band Molotov. In the summer of 2018 she gained access to the abandoned London Underground station at Aldwych to record British band God Damn on the subway platform.

In 2019 Massy produced and mixed the follow up to Life of Agony's River Runs Red album, named The Sound of Scars. Tracks were recorded at Studio Divine in Ashland, Oregon. Later in 2019 Massy mixed a solo album for Taylor Hawkins (drummer for Foo Fighters). The album features performances by Dave Grohl (Foo Fighters, Nirvana), Joe Walsh (Eagles), Chrissie Hynde (Pretenders), LeAnn Rimes, Nancy Wilson (Heart), Perry Farrell (Jane's Addiction, Porno For Pyros), Roger Taylor (Queen), Chris Chaney (Porno For Pyros) and Duff (Guns N' Roses).

Discography

Massy has worked on the following projects:

References

External links
 
 Sylvia Massy on The Producer Series on Triple J
 
 Sylvia Massy Interview NAMM Oral History Library (2021)

Record producers from California
Living people
American audio engineers
People from Flint, Michigan
People from Weed, California
People from Ashland, Oregon
Women audio engineers
Engineers from California
American women record producers
Year of birth missing (living people)